Louise Harris is an Australian actress from Davoren Park, South Australia. She rose to prominence for playing Elizabeth Harvey in the film Snowtown (2011) (based on the Snowtown murders of 1999), for which she received an Australian Academy of Cinema and Television Arts Award for Best Supporting Actress.

Personal life
Harris is a single mother with one son. Prior to landing her role as Elizabeth Harvey in Snowtown (2011), she was unemployed.

Filmography

References

External links
 

Australian film actresses
Living people
Year of birth missing (living people)
Place of birth missing (living people)
Actresses from Adelaide
Best Supporting Actress AACTA Award winners